Darío Abdiel Agrazal Espinosa (born December 28, 1994) is a Panamanian professional baseball pitcher who is a free agent. He previously played in Major League Baseball (MLB) for the Pittsburgh Pirates.

Career

Pittsburgh Pirates
Agrazal signed with the Pittsburgh Pirates as an international free agent in July 2012. He made his professional debut in 2013 with the DSL Pirates and spent the whole season there, going 6–0 with a 2.40 ERA in 13 games (12 starts). In 2014, he played for the GCL Pirates where he was 3–4 with a 4.20 ERA in 12 starts, and in 2015, he pitched for the West Virginia Black Bears where he compiled a 6–5 record, 2.72 ERA, and 1.08 WHIP in 14 games started. Agrazal spent 2016 with the West Virginia Power where he was 8–12 with a 4.20 ERA in 27 starts and 2017 with the Bradenton Marauders where he posted a 5–3 record and 2.91 ERA in 14 games (13 starts), along with pitching in one game for the Altoona Curve.  

The Pirates added Agrazal to their 40-man roster after the 2017 season. He began the 2018 season with Altoona and also spent time with Bradenton. In 17 games (16 starts) with the two teams, he went 5–6 with a 3.65 ERA.

Agrazal was designated for assignment on January 11, 2019, when Aaron Slegers was claimed off waivers. He began 2019 with Altoona before being promoted to the Indianapolis Indians.

On June 15, 2019, he was promoted to the major leagues for the first time, and made his debut versus the Miami Marlins. Agrazal was designated for assignment on November 20, 2019.

Detroit Tigers
On November 25, 2019, Agrazal was traded to the Detroit Tigers in exchange for cash considerations. Agrazal was designated for assignment on January 8, 2020, following the acquisition of Eric Haase. On January 13, 2020, Agrazal cleared waivers and was sent outright to the Toledo Mud Hens. He was later invited to spring training which was cut short due to the COVID-19 pandemic.

Agrazal was assigned to the Tiger's alternate training site when the league resumed play in the summer. His contract was purchased on July 23, 2020, and Agrazal was slated to be a fifth starter. He was placed on the 10-day injured list on July 27 with right forearm strain. The Tigers transferred him to the 45-day injured list on August 19, ending his 2020 season before he could pitch in a single game.

On October 27, 2020, Agrazal was outrighted off of the 40-man roster. He became a free agent on November 2, 2020.

Arizona Diamondbacks
On May 19, 2021, Agrazal signed a minor league contract with the Arizona Diamondbacks organization. He elected free agency on November 7, 2021.

References

External links

1994 births
Living people
People from Aguadulce District
Panamanian expatriate baseball players in the United States
Major League Baseball players from Panama
Major League Baseball pitchers
Pittsburgh Pirates players
Dominican Summer League Pirates players
Panamanian expatriate baseball players in the Dominican Republic
Gulf Coast Pirates players
West Virginia Black Bears players
West Virginia Power players
Bradenton Marauders players
Altoona Curve players
Indianapolis Indians players
Surprise Saguaros players
Amarillo Sod Poodles players